There are many skateboarding brands from all around the world. There are skateboard companies for almost everything a skateboarder could ask for, from boards to wheels to shoes, and even skateboarding-brand watches and wallets.

Most brands sell parts separately.  A complete skateboard can be made of any brands of the products listed below.

Decks
This is a non-exhaustive list of commonly available pro-branded decks, however countless other manufacturers produce unbranded decks.

Trucks
The pro truck brands. These brands also make signature models for their sponsored skaters.

Wheels
Made of polyurethane they attach to trucks.

Bearings
The round metal or ceramic runners which fit inside wheels, used to mount the wheels onto the axle part of a skateboard truck.

Hardware
Griptape, bolts, wax, etc.

Apparel 
Many skateboard brands sell apparel and accessories as well as decks, trucks, wheels and bearings. Skateboard apparel is recognized as an integral part of the skateboard scene.

Shoes

References

 
Skateboarding

ru:Список марок скейтбордов